Love on the Line: The 6.98 EP was a $6.98 EP recording from the Christian metal band Whitecross. It was never released on CD; it was only released on cassette tape & 12" vinyl record formats. Tracks 3 and 4 are taken from the Whitecross debut album, while track 1 would later appear on the remake of their debut album Nineteen Eighty Seven. Track 1 can also be found on a few compilations which are available on CD (Testify & Heavy Righteous Metal compilations). Track 2 is available on CD as a bonus track on the Japanese version of In the Kingdom. The B-side repeats the four songs from the A-side.

CCM magazine stated that the lyrics showed that the band had an "evident evangelistic zeal."

Track listing
"Love on the Line" (6:02)
"I Believe" (3:59)
"No Way I'm Goin' Down" (4:11) 
"Enough Is Enough" (4:01)

Personnel
Scott Wenzel - Vocals
Rex Carroll - Guitars
Mark Hedl - Drums
Jon Sproule - bass
Rex Carroll  - producer (new songs)
Gavin Morkel - executive producer

References

1988 EPs
Whitecross albums
Heavy metal EPs